Anthony Russo or Tony Russo may refer to:

Anthony Russo (director) (born 1970), film and television director-producer
Anthony Russo (mayor) (born 1947), mayor of Hoboken, New Jersey
Tony Russo (whistleblower) (1936–2008), involved in the Pentagon Papers leak
Anthony Russo (mobster) (1916–1979), Genovese crime family figure
Anthony Russo (Ohio politician) (1920–1985), member of the Ohio House of Representatives
Anthony E. Russo (born 1926), member of the New Jersey State Senate
Tony Russel (born Antonio Pietro Russo, and sometimes credited as Tony Russo or Tony Russell; 1925–2017), American actor

See also
Ettore Zappi (1904–1986), aka Tony Russo, Gambino crime family figure and nephew of mobster Andrew Russo